Dan Henig is a songwriter from Ann Arbor, Michigan, who resides in Los Angeles, California. He moved to Nashville to write country music in 2014, and moved to Los Angeles in 2015 to pursue writing pop music. He started working with TH3RD BRAIN Management in 2016 after remaining independent for the beginning of his songwriting career. He signed with Ross Golan and Jaime Zeluck's publishing company And The Melody Is in 2019.

In 2020 & 2021, he's had songs with ZAYN, G-Eazy, Noah Cyrus, 24kGoldn, Chelsea Collins, Conor Matthews, and more. Miley Cyrus called Dan's song Liar "the best song in the world" on Noah Cyrus' Instagram and her own Instagram Story.

Artist/writing discography

References

External links
 

American male singer-songwriters
Living people
Musicians from Ann Arbor, Michigan
Singer-songwriters from Michigan
Year of birth missing (living people)